Hymenocallis latifolia (mangrove spider-lily or perfumed spider-lily) is a bulb-forming perennial that grows on beaches, sand dunes, mangrove swamps and other wetlands along the coasts of Florida, Mexico, and the West Indies (Cuba, Jamaica, Puerto Rico, Cayman Islands, Bahamas, etc.). It has showy white flowers and large green seeds up to 2.5 cm in diam. Common names include "mangrove spider-lily," "perfumed spider-lily,"

References

latifolia
Flora of the Caribbean
Flora of Mexico
Flora of Florida
Plants described in 1768
Flora without expected TNC conservation status